Sean Vendy (born 18 May 1996) is a badminton player from England. He started playing badminton at aged 5 in Orkney, then moved to England at 7. He became part of the England national badminton team in May 2015. In 2022, he partnered with Ben Lane won a silver medal at the Commonwealth Games and a bronze medal in the European Championships.

Career 
In 2021, Vendy claimed his first World Tour title at the Orléans Masters, after in the final he and Ben Lane beat Indian pair Krishna Prasad Garaga and Vishnuvardhan Goud Panjala. Vendy competed at the 2020 Summer Olympics partnered with Lane in the men's doubles, but the duo was eliminated in the group stage.

In 2022, Vendy won the men's doubles bronze medal at the Madrid European Championships with Ben Lane, after in the semi-finals they were defeated by German pair Mark Lamsfuß and Marvin Seidel. In August, he competed at the Commonwealth Games, and won a silver medal with Lane in the men's doubles.

Achievements

Commonwealth Games 
Men's doubles

European Championships 
Men's doubles

European Junior Championships 
Boys' doubles

BWF World Tour (1 title) 
The BWF World Tour, which was announced on 19 March 2017 and implemented in 2018, is a series of elite badminton tournaments sanctioned by the Badminton World Federation (BWF). The BWF World Tour is divided into levels of World Tour Finals, Super 1000, Super 750, Super 500, Super 300 (part of the HSBC World Tour), and the BWF Tour Super 100.

Men's doubles

BWF International Challenge/Series (3 titles, 4 runners-up) 
Men's doubles

  BWF International Challenge tournament
  BWF International Series tournament
  BWF Future Series tournament

References

External links 
 

1996 births
Living people
People from Kirkwall
English male badminton players
Badminton players at the 2020 Summer Olympics
Olympic badminton players of Great Britain
Sportspeople from Orkney
Anglo-Scots
Badminton players at the 2022 Commonwealth Games
Commonwealth Games competitors for England
Commonwealth Games silver medallists for England
Commonwealth Games medallists in badminton
Medallists at the 2022 Commonwealth Games